Georgy Vladimirovich Garmashov (born 12 April 1974) is a Russian professional association football official and a former player.

Club career
He played 9 seasons in the Russian Football National League for FC Chita.

References

1974 births
Living people
Russian footballers
Association football midfielders
FC Chita players